K-Jee (born 5 November 1990) is a Japanese male kickboxer and the former K-1 Cruiserweight Champion and the former Krush Cruiserweight champion.

Kickboxing career
He took part in the 2017 Heavyweight Grand Prix, but lost to the eventual winner Antonio Plazibat in the quarterfinals. He bounced back with a TKO win over Shinya Uemura, during Krush 89.

K-Jee participated in the 2018 K-1 Cruiserweight Grand Prix, for the inaugural K-1 Cruiserweight title. He beat Brian McGrath by TKO in the quarterfinals, but lost a unanimous decision to Sina Karimian in the semifinals.

K-Jee won his next two fights, knocking Yuki Kudo out with a flying knee during Krush 97, and Hitoshi Sugimoto with a right hook during Krush 101.

He fought for his first major title during Krush 104, when he fought Rui Hanazawa for the Krush Cruiserweight title. He defeated Hanazawa by a second round TKO.

K-Jee was scheduled to fight Hisaki Kato in December 2019. Kato won the fight by a second round TKO. The two of them fought a rematch three months later, during Krush 112, which was to be K-Jee's first title defense. K-Jee won the fight by a first round knockout.

K-1 Jee was scheduled to fight Sina Karimian for the K-1 Cruiserweight title during the K-1 World GP event in Fukuoka. He won the fight by TKO, forcing Karimian's corner to throw in the towel midway through the first round. Despite knocking Sina twice in the first round, K-Jee would lose the fight by a second-round knockout.

After being badly hurt near the beginning to the second round, K-Jee staged a comeback victory, winning by way of a low kick knockout.

K-Jee was scheduled to face Seiya Tanigawa at K-1 World GP 2021 in Osaka on December 4, 2021. He was later forced to withdraw from the fight. K-Jee participated in the 2022 K-1 openweight tournament, held at K-1: K'Festa 5 on April 3, 2022. He faced the Krush cruiserweight champion Mahmoud Sattari in the quarterfinals. He lost the fight by a first-round knockout.

K-Jee faced Seiya Tanigawa at K-1 World GP 2022 in Fukuoka on August 11, 2022.

Championships and accomplishments
 2019 Krush Cruiserweight Champion 
 2020 K-1 Cruiserweight Champion

Fight record

|-  style="background:#fbb"
| 2022-08-11|| Loss||align=left| Seiya Tanigawa ||  K-1 World GP 2022 in Fukuoka || Fukuoka, Japan || Decision (Unanimous)|| 3 || 3:00
|-
|- style="background:#fbb;"
| 2022-04-03 || Loss ||align=left| Mahmoud Sattari || K-1: K'Festa 5, Tournament Quarterfinals || Tokyo, Japan || KO (Left hook) || 1 || 1:28
|- style="background:#cfc;"
| 2021-07-17|| Win ||align=left| Ryo Aitaka || K-1 World GP 2021 in Fukuoka || Fukuoka, Japan || KO (Low kick) || 2 || 1:04
|- style="background:#fbb;"
| 2021-03-28 || Loss ||align=left| Sina Karimian || K'Festa 4 Day 2 || Yoyogi, Japan || KO (Spinning backfist) || 2 || 0:26
|-
! style=background:white colspan=9 |

|-
|- style="background:#cfc;"
| 2020-11-02 || Win ||align=left| Sina Karimian || K-1 World GP 2020 in Fukuoka || Fukuoka, Japan || TKO (Corner Stoppage) || 1 || 1:54
|-
! style=background:white colspan=9 |
|- style="background:#cfc;"
| 2020-03-28 || Win ||align=left| Hisaki Kato || Krush 112 || Tokyo, Japan || KO (Left hook to the body) || 1 || 2:10
|-
! style=background:white colspan=9 |
|- style="background:#fbb;"
| 2019-12-28 || Loss ||align=left| Hisaki Kato || K-1 World GP 2019 Japan: ～Women's Flyweight Championship Tournament～ || Tokyo, Japan || TKO (Three knockdowns) || 2 || 1:17
|- style="background:#cfc;"
| 2019-08-31 || Win ||align=left| Rui Hanazawa || Krush 104 || Tokyo, Japan || TKO (Punches) || 2 || 1:43
|-
! style=background:white colspan=9 |
|- style="background:#cfc;"
| 2019-05-18 || Win ||align=left| Hitoshi Sugimoto || Krush 101 || Tokyo, Japan || KO (Right hook) || 2 || 1:24
|- style="background:#cfc;"
| 2019-01-26 || Win ||align=left| Yuki Kudo || Krush 97 || Tokyo, Japan || KO (Flying knee) || 2 || 1:13
|- style="background:#fbb;"
| 2018-09-24 || Loss ||align=left| Sina Karimian || K-1 World GP 2018: inaugural Cruiserweight Championship Tournament, Semi Finals || Saitama, Japan || Decision (Unanimous) || 3 || 3:00
|- style="background:#cfc;"
| 2018-09-24 || Win ||align=left| Brian McGrath || K-1 World GP 2018: inaugural Cruiserweight Championship Tournament, Quarter Finals || Saitama, Japan || TKO (Punches) || 2 || 2:37
|- style="background:#cfc;"
| 2018-06-30 || Win ||align=left| Shinya Uemura || Krush 89 || Tokyo, Japan || TKO (Leg kicks) || 2 || 1:20
|- style="background:#fbb;"
| 2018-02-12 || Loss||align=left| Ryo Aitaka || Bigbang 32 || Tokyo, Japan || Decision (Majority) || 3 || 3:00
|-
! style=background:white colspan=9 |
|- style="background:#fbb;"
| 2017-11-23 || Loss ||align=left| Antonio Plazibat || K-1 World GP 2017 Japan Heavyweight Championship Tournament, Quarter Finals || Saitama, Japan || KO (Left hook to the body) || 1 || 1:40
|- style="background:#cfc;"
| 2017-06-08 || Win ||align=left| Tsutomu Takahagi || Krush 78 || Tokyo, Japan || TKO (Referee Stoppage) || 1 || 1:59
|- style="background:#fbb;"
| 2017-04-22 || Loss ||align=left| Koichi || K-1 World GP 2017: Super Bantamweight Tournament || Tokyo, Japan || KO (Right Straight) || 3 || 0:38
|- style="background:#cfc;"
| 2017-02-12 || Win ||align=left| Ryo Aitaka || Bigbang 28 || Tokyo, Japan || TKO (Ref. Stop/Low Kicks) || 3 || 2:23
|- style="background:#cfc;"
| 2016-12-18 || Win ||align=left| Hidekazu Kimura || Krush 71 || Tokyo, Japan || Decision (Unanimous) || 3 || 3:00
|- style="background:#cfc;"
| 2016-09-19 || Win ||align=left| Yoshinari || K-1 World GP 2016 Super Featherweight World Tournament || Tokyo, Japan || TKO (Punches) || 2 || 1:23
|- style="background:#cfc;"
| 2016-06-24 || Win ||align=left| Hitoshi Sugimoto || K-1 WORLD GP 2016 IN JAPAN ～World 65 kg Tournament～ || Tokyo, Japan || Decision (Unanimous) || 3 || 3:00
|- style="background:#fbb;"
| 2016-02-30 || Loss ||align=left| Zaurus Asami || Krush 64 || Tokyo, Japan || TKO (Nose injury) || 2 || 0:04
|- style="background:#fbb;"
| 2015-09-22 || Loss ||align=left| Kazuya Akimoto || K-1 World GP 2015 Survival Wars || Tokyo, Japan || Decision (Unanimous) || 3 || 3:00
|- style="background:#fbb;"
| 2015-04-19 || Loss ||align=left| Kotetsu || K-1 World GP 2015 -55kg Championship Tournament || Tokyo, Japan || KO (Right hook) || 1 || 2:15
|- style="background:#fbb;"
| 2014-07-13 || Loss ||align=left| Yutaro Yamauchi || Krush 43 || Tokyo, Japan || Decision (Unanimous) || 3 || 3:00
|- style="background:#cfc;"
| 2012-10-21 || Win ||align=left| Meriken Yuto || KAKUMEI PURITY || Osaka, Japan || KO (Right cross) || 3 || 1:49
|-
| colspan=9 | Legend:

See also
 List of male kickboxers
 List of K-1 champions

References

Living people
1990 births
People from Kumamoto
Sportspeople from Kumamoto Prefecture
Cruiserweight kickboxers
Japanese male kickboxers